Jaungulbene Manor is a manor house in the historical region of Vidzeme, in northern Latvia. It was built in Tudor neo-Gothic style and completed in 1878. In the 1920s Jaungulbene Manor was nationalized in accordance with Latvian Land Reform of 1920.
From 1927 until the 1990s the building housed an agricultural school.

See also
List of palaces and manor houses in Latvia

References

External links
  Jaungulbene Manor
 

Manor houses in Latvia